Venezillo is a genus of woodlice in the family Armadillidae. There are more than 140 described species in Venezillo.

See also
 List of Venezillo species

References

External links

 

Woodlice
Articles created by Qbugbot